Nancy Evans (1903 – 28 July 1998) was a Welsh table tennis player.

Career 
In the 1930s and 1940s Nancy Evans was the leading table tennis player in Wales. Evans was appointed as Welsh TT Association General Secretary in 1945, a position she hold until 1989. She was member of the first committee of the European Table Tennis Union. She was elected as ETTUs first ‘permanent’ Honorary Secretary/Treasurer in 1960.

She was married to Roy Evans in 1933.

The ETTU Cup was renamed ETTU Nancy Evans Cup after her in 1984.

She died in Cardiff.

References

External links
 ETTU Honorary Members

Welsh female table tennis players
1903 births
1998 deaths
Welsh sportswomen